One Line may refer to:

 "One Line", a track of the PJ Harvey album Stories from the City, Stories from the Sea
 One Line (film), a 2017 South Korean film